First Island Montessori School (FIMS) also known as "First Island", was established in 2014 to provide a British curriculum in a Montessori setting in Lagos, Nigeria. It is run by the multinational education company, M, M & M Educational Firm, as a branch of First Island Schools.

The school is a co-educational international school for children aged from 24 months to 11 years. Its current head of school is Peace Nwobudu Ideozu B.Ed

Schools in Lagos